Alessandro Simonetta (born 17 March 1986 in Italy) is an Italian still in business.

Career

While still in school, Alessandro Simonetta was called up to the AS Roma squad for a Champions League match against Real Madrid CF. Despite having made the bench, he did not play. [1] After playing in the Italian second and third divisions, Alessandro Simonetta joined the police at the age of 24, playing for ASD Astrea, the fourth division police team and becoming one of the most wanted players at an amateur level. [1]

Alessandro Simonetta was well known in the Football Manager video game for his potential. [1]

References

External links
 

Italian footballers
Living people
Association football wingers
Association football forwards
1986 births
F.C. Südtirol players
S.S. Arezzo players
A.S. Sambenedettese players